Sir Hew Francis Anthony Strachan,  (born 1 September 1949) is a British military historian, well known for his leadership in scholarly studies of the British Army and the history of the First World War. He is currently professor of international relations at the University of St Andrews.  Before that Strachan was the Chichele Professor of the History of War at All Souls College, Oxford.

Early life
Strachan was born in Edinburgh, Scotland. He was educated at Rugby School, then in 1968 was a merchant seaman for three months, working his passage around the world on ships of Ben Line Steamers Ltd. He then spent three years at Corpus Christi College, Cambridge, graduating BA in 1971 and proceeding to M.A. in 1975. In 1973, he joined a survey of antiquities in the Sudan.

Career
In 1975, Strachan was elected a research fellow of Corpus Christi College, and in 1977–1978 was a senior lecturer in war studies at the Royal Military Academy Sandhurst. In 1978, he returned to his Cambridge college as a tutor.

He became admissions tutor and then senior tutor of Corpus Christi College, and in 1992 was elected a life fellow. He was Professor of Modern History at the University of Glasgow from 1992 to 2000, then migrated to Oxford as Chichele Professor of the History of War at All Souls.

He was director of the Oxford Programme on the Changing Character of War from 2004 to 2015, and published a series of important articles on strategy, as well as editing books which have arisen from the project.

He is a Fellow of the Royal Society of Edinburgh and the Royal Historical Society. He was appointed a deputy lieutenant of Tweeddale in 2006. He is a member of the Academic Advisory Panel of the Royal Air Force Centre for Air Power Studies. In addition, he is on the Chief of the Defence Staff's strategic advisory panel, the UK Defence Academy Advisory Board, and is an advisory fellow of the Barsanti Military History Center at the University of North Texas. He was on the council of the National Army Museum and is currently a trustee of the Imperial War Museum. In 2016, he became Patron of Western Front Association. He is a visiting professor of the Royal Norwegian Air Force Academy in Trondheim and in 2009 was the Sir Howard Kippenberger Professor at Victoria University Wellington. He sits on the advisory board of the Centre for War and Diplomacy at Lancaster University.

On 20 May 2014, Strachan was appointed as Lord Lieutenant of Tweeddale, in succession to Captain David Bingham Younger.

In 2015, he left Oxford to serve as professor of international relations at the University of St Andrews.

Research
Strachan's early research and published work focussed on the history of the British Army, and he was awarded the Templer Medal for From Waterloo to Balaclava and the Westminster Medal for The Politics of the British Army. Commissioned by the Oxford University Press to write a history of the First World War to replace C. R. M. F. Cruttwell's one-volume A History of the Great War, 1914-1918, Strachan completed the first of three volumes, The First World War: Volume 1: To Arms in 2001 to wide acclaim and is acknowledged as one of the world's authorities on the subject. Accompanying the print publication of his one volume survey The First World War (2004) was a multi-part documentary series for television entitled The First World War, with some episodes being titled after the chapters in the written work. This set was also released on DVD by Image Entertainment.

According to Jonathan Boff, he became "the most influential British historian of the First World War of his generation." He broke through traditional intra-disciplinary boundaries and national borders. He tirelessly encouraged others, both inside academia and out. His impact produces histories of the Great War that are global and multi-dimensional, while rooted in the detail of military operations. The results exemplify the new military historiography.

Strachan is editor of the Great Battles series published by Oxford University Press.

Views
In January 2014, Strachan told The Daily Beast that President Barack Obama's failures in Afghanistan and Syria have shown that he is "chronically incapable" of military strategy. He said, "Bush may have had totally fanciful political objectives in terms of trying to fight a global War on Terror, which was inherently astrategic, but at least he had a clear sense of what he wanted to do in the world. Obama has no sense of what he wants to do in the world."

Awards and honours
In 2005 Strachan was bestowed with the Honorary degree of Doctor of the University (D.Univ) from the University of Paisley. He was knighted in the 2013 New Years Honours List for services to the Ministry of Defence. In 2016, he won the Pritzker Literature Award for Lifetime Achievement in Military Writing. He was appointed as the Lord Lieutenant of Tweeddale on 7 June 2014 by HM Queen Elizabeth II.

In July 2017, Strachan was elected a Fellow of the British Academy (FBA), the United Kingdom's national academy for the humanities and social sciences.

In 2018, Strachan received the Morison Prize from The Society for Military History.

Selected publications
 British Military Uniforms, 1768–1796 (Arms and Armour, 1975)
 History of the Cambridge University Officers Training Corps (1976)  
 European Armies and the Conduct of War (London, 1983) 
 Wellington's Legacy: The Reform of the British Army 1830–54 (Manchester, 1984) 
 From Waterloo to Balaclava: Tactics, Technology and the British Army (Cambridge, 1985) 
 The Politics of the British Army (Oxford, 1997) 
 The Oxford Illustrated History of the First World War (ed.) (Oxford, 1998) 
 The First World War: Volume 1: To Arms (Oxford, 2001)  (first of an expected three volume history)
 Military Lives Oxford: Oxford University Press, 2002.  
 The First World War: A New Illustrated History (Simon & Schuster, 2003)
 The First World War (Viking, 2004)  (single volume survey of the war)
 The First World War in Africa (Oxford, 2004)  
 German Strategy in the First World War in Wolfgang Elz and Sönke Neitzel: Internationale Beziehungen im 19. und 20. Jahrhundert, pp. 127–144 (2003) 
 Clausewitz's On War: a Biography (Atlantic Monthly Press 2007) .
 with Holger Afflerbach: How Fighting Ends. A History of Surrender. Oxford University Press, Oxford/New York 2012, .
 The Direction of War: Contemporary Strategy in Historical Perspective 2013.  
 British Generals in Blair's Wars, eds. Jonathan Bailey, Richard Iron and Hew Strachan (Ashgate Publishing, 2013).
Prefaces :

 Flesh and Steel During the Great War: The Transformation of the French Army and the Invention of Modern Warfare, Michel Goya (Pen and Sword Military, 2018) - 
 A Military History of Scotland, eds. Edward M. Spiers, Jeremy Crang, Matthew Strickland ( 2013).

Media 
 Channel 4 DVD: The First World War – The Complete Series OCLC: 63265523 (region 1), 883640397 (region 4)  ASIN: B0009S2K9C (based on his book)

See also 
 The First World War (TV series)

References

Further reading
 Boff, Jonathan. "Sir Hew Strachan and the Study of the First World War." War in History 27.4 (2020): 605–616.
 Herwig, Holger H. "Strachan and the Great War: A Lifelong Quest." War in History 27.4 (2020): 590–604.
 King, Anthony. "Hew Strachan and the Sociology of War." War in History 27.4 (2020): 575–589.
 Scheipers, Sibylle. "Strachan on Clausewitz: Setting Standards for Research and Study." War in History 27.4 (2020): 560–574.
 Contemporary Authors Online, 2007
 Debrett's People of Today, 2007
 Who's who, 2009

External links 

Interview on The First World War at the Pritzker Military Museum & Library
Europe, Geopolitics and Strategy with Professor Sir Hew Strachan 2015 lecture at Brussels School of International Studies

 

1949 births
Academics of the Royal Military Academy Sandhurst
Living people
Historians of World War I
Fellows of All Souls College, Oxford
Fellows of Corpus Christi College, Cambridge
Academics of the University of Glasgow
Fellows of the Royal Society of Edinburgh
Fellows of the Royal Historical Society
Knights Bachelor
British military writers
British military historians
Chichele Professors of the History of War
People educated at Rugby School
Academics from Edinburgh
Lord-Lieutenants of Tweeddale
Fellows of the British Academy
Writers from Edinburgh